Don't Blame it on your Karma  is a Spanish romantic comedy film based on a novel by Laura Norton.

Plot
In 1990's Sara (Verónica Echegui) is a high school unpopular girl. She has a crush on the popular Aarón Humilde (Álex Garcia), a senior high school who has a band. After Aarón leaves town unannounced they lose contact.

Now, 13 years later, she works with feathers, making hats, headdresses, bow ties, dresses and anything else that might require plumage. She is a genuine artist and has a small shop/workshop in a Madrid neighbourhood where she just about manages to make a living. What a shame that her quiet, ordered world is about to collapse around her ears. Somehow, Sara will have to put up with a fleeing mother (Elvira Mínguez), a depressed father (Jordi Sánchez), a rebellious sister and her eccentric fiancé and, especially, a boyfriend she hasn't seen in ages who's about to make her the most absurd proposal in history.

Cast
 Verónica Echegui as Sara Escribano.
 Álex Garcia as Aarón Humilde, Sara's past dream boy who is engaged to Lucía.
 Elvira Mínguez as Berta Milagros Rodríguez, Sara and Lucia's mother.
  as Lucía Escribano, Aarón' s fiancé and Sara's sister.
 Jordi Sánchez as Arturo Escribano, an architect.

Production 
The film is associate produced by Spanish pubcaster Televisión Española (TVE), its biggest pay TV operator, Movistar Plus, regional state TV Televisió de Catalunya and Sony channel AXN España, a full flush of TV players which underscores the title's attractiveness. Spain's ICAA Film and Audiovisual Arts Institute and the Catalan Institute of Cultural Enterprises (ICEC) put up co-funding.

Verónica Echegui was not the first choice for the role of Sara. The role of Sara was originally played by Clara Lago but then she declined in favor to starring in the film 'Órbita 9' 

The film was shot during seven weekends in Guadalajara, Madrid, and Hong Kong.

Soundtrack 
The music created for the film is divided into two parts – Aaron's songs and the film score itself. The score itself is a mixture of kooky vintage, indie pop and funky nonsense that complements the very strong visual style of the film.

The soundtrack and original songs were composed by Simon Smith.  The lead male character, Aaron, is a pop star and there are many musical scenes that needed original songs to establish the character's career and reveal his feelings.  Victor Hernandez also provided help with lyrics and song development before shooting.  Alex Garcia, who plays Aaron, had never sung before and took intensive voice and guitar lessons and worked closely with Simon and Maria to develop the character.

The soundtrack has a fresh pop style, drawing on funk, jazz, pop, dub, dance music and electronic music.  Simon also wrote several other songs for the score in English that reappear throughout the film, sung by Catalan singer Maria Rodés, to represent the inner mind of the female lead character, Sara.

Release 

This film is also featured in the 2017 Miami International Film Festival’s HBO Ibero American Competition Film Category  and Málaga Film Festival The film was nominated for Best Costume Design at Goya Award.

Box office
The film grossed $2,236,857 in Spain.

Home media

The DVD of Don't Blame the Karma was released on 15 March  2017, in both single-disc and two-disc deluxe editions and also released on VHS and UMD Video formats. In addition to the film, the deluxe edition contained featurettes and other bonus materials.

References

External links
 
 
 
 

Spanish romantic comedy films
Films shot in Madrid
Films shot in Hong Kong